West Germany sent a delegation to compete at the 1960 Summer Paralympics in Rome, Italy. Its athletes finished third in the gold and overall medal count.

Medalists

See also 

 Germany at the 1960 Summer Olympics

References 

Nations at the 1960 Summer Paralympics
1960
Summer Paralympics
1960 in German sport